Hugh Reid Poland (January 19, 1910 – March 29, 1984) was an American professional baseball catcher, manager and scout. A native of Tompkinsville, Kentucky, he attended Western Kentucky University.

Poland's baseball career began in the St. Louis Cardinals' far-flung farm system of the 1930s. He eventually reached the highest minor-league level (then Double-A), but his Major League Baseball debut did not occur until , when at age 33 Poland appeared in a New York Giants uniform on April 22. He was traded five days and four games later to the Boston Braves, with infielder Connie Ryan, in exchange for future Baseball Hall of Fame catcher Ernie Lombardi. But, unlike Lombardi, Poland was exclusively a reserve catcher during his MLB career. He appeared in all or parts of five seasons (1943–44; 1946–48), for the Giants, Braves, Philadelphia Phillies and Cincinnati Reds, batting a meek .185 with no home runs and 19 runs batted in in 83 games played.

Poland's minor league managerial career preceded his MLB service when, at age 30, he skipped the Cardinals' Cambridge Canners affiliate in the Class D Eastern Shore League in 1940. In 1949, he rejoined the Giants and managed in their farm system through 1954, including service with the Triple-A Ottawa Giants and the Double-A Nashville Vols. He then scouted for the Giants' franchise until his death, at age 74, in Guthrie, Kentucky.

References

External links

1910 births
1984 deaths
Baseball players from Kentucky
Boston Braves players
Cambridge Canners players
Cincinnati Reds players
Columbus Red Birds players
Decatur Commodores players
Houston Buffaloes players
Huntington Red Birds players
Indianapolis Indians players
Jersey City Giants players
Major League Baseball catchers
Minor league baseball managers
Nashville Vols managers
New York Giants (NL) players
New York Giants (NL) scouts
People from Tompkinsville, Kentucky
Philadelphia Phillies players
Rochester Red Wings players
San Francisco Giants scouts
Seattle Rainiers players
Trenton Giants players
Western Kentucky Hilltoppers baseball players